Cornipulvina is a genus of fungi within the Boliniaceae family. This is a monotypic genus, containing the single species Cornipulvina ellipsoides.

References

External links
Index Fungorum

Boliniales
Monotypic Sordariomycetes genera